Valentine Wheels is the sixty-fourth release and ninth live album by Tangerine Dream. The album was recorded in 1997 from the first half of the Shepherds Bush concert. The album was initially available only through the internet. The next year, the album was officially released at retail. This is the final album to feature guitarist Zlatko Perica as a member.

Track listing

Personnel
 Tangerine Dream
 Edgar Froese - keyboards
 Jerome Froese - keyboards
 Zlatko Perica - guitar
Guest musicians
 Emil Hachfeld - percussion

References

1998 live albums
Tangerine Dream albums